The 1923 Chico State Wildcats football team represented Chico State Teachers College—now known as California State University, Chico—as a member of the California Coast Conference (CCC) during the 1923 college football season. Led by first-year head coach Art Acker, Chico State compiled an overall record of 5–2–2 with a mark of 2–1 in conference play. The team outscored its opponents 191 to 48 for the season and had three shutout victories. The Wildcats played home games at College Field in Chico, California.

Schedule

Notes

References

Chico State
Chico State Wildcats football seasons
Chico State Wildcats football